Sheyb-e Nasri (also Romanized as Sheyb-e Nāṣrī) is a village in Sarduiyeh Rural District, Sarduiyeh District, Jiroft County, Kerman Province, Iran. At the 2006 census, its population was 247, in 41 families.

References 

Populated places in Jiroft County